Game Tight Vol. 2: The Collaboration Album is a collaboration album by rapper JT the Bigga Figga.  The album was released in 2003 for Get Low Recordz and was produced by JT the Bigga Figga, One Drop Scott, Rick Rock, Sean T, and Tone Capone.

Track listing

References

JT the Bigga Figga albums
2003 albums